The following is a list of transfers for the 2017 Major League Soccer season that have been made during the 2016-17 MLS offseason all the way through to the roster freeze on September 15, 2017.

Transfers

References

2017

Major League Soccer
Major League Soccer